The County of Hopetoun is one of the 49 counties of South Australia on the state's west coast. It was proclaimed in 1892 by Governor Algernon Keith-Falconer and named for John Hope then the Governor of Victoria.

Hundreds 
The County of Hopetoun contains the following 9 hundreds, covering approximately the south-eastern half of its total area:
 Inland from northwest to southeast: Bice, Lucy, Miller, Trunch, and May (Yalata, Coorabie)
 On the south coastline from west to east: Russell, Wookata, Sturdee, and Caldwell (Coorabie, Fowlers Bay)

See also
 Lands administrative divisions of South Australia

References

Hopetoun